Cumberland County Council may be:

In Australia
 Cumberland County, New South Wales (defunct Council abolished in 1964)
 Cumberland City Council (New South Wales)

In the United Kingdom
 Cumberland County Council, England, the county council of Cumberland from 1889 to 1974
 Cumberland Council, England, the unitary authority of Cumberland from 2023

In the United States
 Cumberland Council BSA, Kentucky
 Cumberland Council BSA, Maryland
 Cumberland Council BSA, Tennessee
 Cumberland County Council BSA, Maine
 Cumberland County Council BSA, New Jersey
 Cumberland Valley Council (Pennsylvania)
 Upper Cumberland Council (Kentucky)